Robert Munn (born July 26, 1990) is an American rower. He was part of the American boat in the men's eight event at the 2016 Summer Olympics.

References

1990 births
Living people
American male rowers
Olympic rowers of the United States
Rowers at the 2016 Summer Olympics